Oregana Creek Provincial Park is a provincial park in British Columbia, Canada, located 150 kilometres northwest of Salmon Arm, British Columbia, near Adams River.  The park, which is 286 ha. in size, was established in 2010.

External links
News release 
BC Ministry of Environment

 
Provincial parks of British Columbia
2010 establishments in British Columbia
Protected areas established in 2010